Komiyama (written: 小宮山 or 込山) is a Japanese surname. Notable people with the surname include:

Haruka Komiyama (込山榛香) (born 1998), Japanese idol
 (born 1944), Japanese scientist
 (born 1965), Japanese baseball player
 (born 1985), Japanese baseball player
 (born 1984), Japanese footballer
 (born 1965), Japanese politician
 (born 1948), Japanese politician

See also
6405 Komiyama, main-belt asteroid

Japanese-language surnames